Francis Slacke  (6 June 1853 – 8 August 1940) was a senior officer in the Indian Civil Service and later became Lieutenant-Governor of Bengal.

Early life
Francis Alexander Slack (post Slacke) was born in the parish of Saint Saviour in Jersey and educated at Blundell's School in Tiverton, University College, Oxford and St John's College, Cambridge. On 19 November 1879 Slacke married Caroline Elizabeth Cave, 2nd daughter of Thomas Cave, M.P. and sister of Viscount Cave.

Career
Slacke entered the Indian Civil Service in 1874 and was admitted at the Inner Temple on 27 May 1875. His appointments included:
 Magistrate and Collector - 1892
Secretary to the Board of Revenue – 1896
Secretary to the Government of Bengal (Revenue and General Department) – 1900
Commissioner – 1903
Major, Calcutta Light Horse (1905-8)
Member of Board of Revenue – 1906
Lieutenant-Governor of Bengal - 1906
Vice-president of Bengal Legislative Council - 1910
Vice-president of Bengal Executive Council - 1911

Slacke retired from the Indian Civil Service in 1912 and was subsequently appointed Fellow of Calcutta University (1907) and President of Fisheries Advisory Committee (1908).

References

Obituary of Mr F.A. Slacke, The Times, Friday, 9 August 1940 (pg. 7; Issue 48690; col F)

1853 births
1940 deaths
People educated at Blundell's School
Alumni of University College, Oxford
Alumni of St John's College, Cambridge
Indian Civil Service (British India) officers
Lieutenant-governors of Bengal
Members of the Inner Temple
Companions of the Order of the Star of India
People from Saint Saviour, Jersey
Indian Defence Force officers